Dante Stills (born December 14, 1999) is an American football defensive lineman who plays at West Virginia.

College career

2018
In 2018 Stills had debut as a true freshman against Tennessee. At the end of the season he had 16 tackles for the year, three sacks, six tackles for loss and two forced fumbles (which was tied for the team lead. He was named by The Athletic and ESPN a Freshman All-American.

2019
In 12 games, Stills ended the 2019 season with 24 tackles, a forced fumble and a pass breakup and earned Second Team All-Big 12 honors.

2020
Stills started all 10 games in the shortened 2020 season his final year playing with his brother. He ended his junior season with 35 tackles, 1 fumble recovery, a blocked kick and two pass breakups. After the season he was named All-Big 12 Conference First Team by Pro Football Focus and Phil Steele and All-Big 12 Conference Second Team by the AP. Additionally he was a PFF All-American honorable mention.

2021
In 2021 Stills decided to remain at West Virginia for an additional season instead of entering the NFL Draft. He was also named a preseason All American.

Personal life
His brother, Darius Stills, played with him on the Mountaineers defensive line. Their father, Gary Stills, starred at WVU, and played in the NFL for 10 years. Gary's brother is Ken Stills, former safety and father of wide receiver Kenny Stills.

References

External links
 West Virginia Mountaineers bio

1999 births
Living people
African-American players of American football
American football defensive tackles
West Virginia Mountaineers football players
Sportspeople from Fairmont, West Virginia
Players of American football from West Virginia
21st-century African-American sportspeople